Garrett Community Mausoleum is a historic mausoleum located in Calvary Cemetery at Garrett, DeKalb County, Indiana.  It was built in 1922, and is a one-story, cubic granite structure with simple Classical Revival style detail.  It measures 30 feet wide and 42 feet deep.  The mausoleum was largely used for interments into the 1950s, with the most recent in 1999.

It was added to the National Register of Historic Places in 2014.

References

Monuments and memorials on the National Register of Historic Places in Indiana
Neoclassical architecture in Indiana
Buildings and structures completed in 1922
Buildings and structures in DeKalb County, Indiana
National Register of Historic Places in DeKalb County, Indiana
Mausoleums on the National Register of Historic Places
1922 establishments in Indiana
Death in Indiana